Agnes Mary Claypole Moody (January 1, 1870 – August 29, 1954) was an American zoologist and professor of natural science.

Early life and education
Agnes Mary Claypole Moody was born in Bristol, England to Jane (Trotter) and Edward Waller Claypole. She had a twin sister, Edith Jane Claypole (1870–1915), who was also a biologist.  She attended Buchtel College, and in 1894 she attended Cornell University for her master's degree. She completed doctoral work at the University of Chicago in 1896.

For her Master of Science thesis, Moody studied the digestive tract of eels. Her 1896 doctoral dissertation at the University of Chicago was titled "The Embryology and Oögenesis of Anurida maritima." Following completion of her doctorate, Moody served as an assistant at Cornell University despite her PhD, as women were relegated to the lowest ranks of faculty at the time.

Career
Moody was the first woman appointed to a teaching position in the Medical Department of Cornell University.

She worked in various positions at Throop College, (now California Institute of Technology), including as instructor in Zoology, and as Professor of Natural Science and Curator (1903-4). Moody was a longtime member of the city council in Berkeley, California, from 1923 to 1932. She was also elected to Berkeley's school board, served as chair of the Berkeley Girl Scout Council, and was a member of Berkeley's League of Women Voters. She served a term as president of the Berkeley Civic League, and was appointed to the Berkeley Charities Commission. Of her community work, a local historian in 1928 commented that "No woman of Alameda County has made a deeper impression on the educational and civil life of the community than Mrs. Agnes Claypole Moody."

There was a Girl Scout camp near Berkeley named Camp Agnes Moody, after Dr. Moody, in the 1930s.

Personal life
Agnes Mary Claypole married Robert Orton Moody (an anatomy professor who was the son of Mary Blair Moody) in 1903 in Pasadena. She was widowed when he died in 1948. Agnes Claypole Moody died on August 29, 1954.

References

1870 births
1954 deaths
American zoologists
Cornell University alumni
Scientists from Bristol